Roland Allard (4 June 1911 – 11 August 1988) was a French alpine skier. He competed in the men's combined event at the 1936 Winter Olympics.

References

1911 births
1988 deaths
French male alpine skiers
Olympic alpine skiers of France
Alpine skiers at the 1936 Winter Olympics